Supovsky is a rural locality (a khutor) in Enemskoye Urban Settlement of Takhtamukaysky District, the Republic of Adygea, Russia. The population was 576 as of 2018. There are 7 streets.

Geography 
Supovsky is located 8 km southwest of Takhtamukay (the district's administrative centre) by road. Otradny is the nearest rural locality.

References 

Rural localities in Takhtamukaysky District